Charlie Taaffe (April 20, 1950 – October 29, 2019) was an American gridiron football coach. After retiring in 2014, he was hired by a company called Quarterback Country to run a year-round quarterback training and development program. He served as offensive coordinator for the UCF Knights from 2009 to 2014. Taaffe's coaching career stretches back to 1973, when he was an offensive coach for the University at Albany. From 1984 to 1986, he was an offensive coordinator for Army, as well as for the Maryland Terrapins from 2001 to 2005, and the Pittsburgh Panthers for the 2006 season. Taaffe also served as the head football coach at The Citadel from 1987 to 1996, and was the head coach of the Canadian Football League's Montreal Alouettes and Hamilton Tiger-Cats.

Coaching career
After 4 years as a college quarterback (1 with Clemson, then 3 with Siena College) Taaffe's coaching career began in 1973 as an Offensive Backfield coach at Albany. He then served two years as a Graduate Assistant at Georgia Tech (Wide Receivers) and North Carolina State (Offensive Backs). From 1976 to 1980 he was an assistant coach at Virginia, working with the offensive backfield, linebackers, and special teams. From 1981 to 1983 he was a quarterbacks coach and offensive backfield coach at the U.S. Military Academy. From 1984 until 1986 Taaffe served a successful stint as an Army's offensive coordinator. In his three seasons as offensive coordinator, the Cadets had a combined record of 23–13.

The Citadel
In 1987, Taaffe was hired as head football coach at The Citadel. In 1992, he coached what was arguably the best in The Citadel's history, finishing 11–2 and was the top ranked team at the end of the regular season. The team however lost to Youngstown State in the quarterfinals. For his efforts, Taaffe won the Eddie Robinson Award. In 10 seasons at The Citadel, his overall record was 55–47–1, including six seasons of .500 or better and is the school's winningest head coach. Taaffe also led the Bulldogs to a 6–5 record against Division I-A teams, with wins against Arkansas, Army, Navy, and South Carolina.

Taaffe was suspended by the school for the entire 1996 season after his second drunken-driven arrest in three years. Taaffe admitted to the police that he had four to six beers prior to driving. He was acquitted of the charges on February 6, 1997 after prosecutors failed to prove that Taaffe was under the influence when he was stopped. It was the second time he had been cleared of drunken driving.

Montreal Alouettes
Taaffe was offensive coordinator of the CFL's Montreal Alouettes from 1997 to 1998, helping the Als to a 25–10–1 record. In 1999, he became the team's head coach. With Taaffe at the helm, the Alouettes had a combined 25–14 record, including an appearance in the 2000 Grey Cup. For his efforts in 1999 and 2000, Taaffe won the Annis Stukus Trophy as the CFL's Coach of the Year, making him only the second Montreal coach to win the award (Marv Levy being the first in 1974) and the first coach in CFL history to earn the honor in each of his first two seasons.

While in Montreal, Taaffe's offenses put up some impressive numbers. In 2000, the Alouettes broke the CFL's all-time record for points in a regular season as they posted 594. Taaffe helped quarterback Anthony Calvillo to a 112.9 passer rating in 2000. Running back Mike Pringle also excelled in Taaffe's system, rushing for a league-best 1,656 yards in 1999.

Maryland
In 2001 Taaffe became Maryland's offensive coordinator/quarterbacks coach. In his first year, Taaffe was able to steer Maryland to 390 points (a then school record) and an average of 35.5 points per game. The Terps' 439.7 yards of total offense per game were the best in the ACC. Taaffe's option offense helped the team to an average of 220.7 yards per game on the ground, second-best in the league. Shaun Hill flourished at quarterback and was a second team All-ACC selection. In 2002, the Terps set a school record for points scored with 451 while finishing second in the ACC in rushing (198.8 ypg) and scoring (32.2 ppg) offense. Taaffe helped guide quarterback Scott McBrien to an honorable mention all-league performer and finished 12th nationally in pass efficiency.

At Maryland Taaffe's offense earned national respect with a balanced attack that beat opponents both on the ground and through the air. In 2004, he led the offense during the school's first-ever victory over Florida State, then ranked No. 5. A year earlier, Taaffe helped guide the Terps through injuries to finish the season ranked in the top 30 nationally in four offensive categories (rushing (24th), total offense (28th), scoring (27th) and pass efficiency (26th).

Hamilton Tiger-Cats
On December 15, 2006 Taaffe was hired as the head coach of the Hamilton Tiger-Cats. With little talent to work with, Taaffe not surprisingly led the Tiger-Cats to a 3–15 record, with only one win against fellow Eastern Division teams. Despite Taaffe's offensive credentials, the Ti-Cats nearly 80 points fewer than any other team in the league. On September 8, 2008 the Tiger-Cats fired Taaffe and replaced him with offensive coordinator Marcel Bellefeuille.

UCF
On January 5, 2009 the University of Central Florida hired Taaffe as offensive coordinator. UCF was in much needed help on offense after finishing the 2008 season ranked 119th on total offense and 115th in passing offense. Charlie also brought his son Brian Taaffe, a freshman quarterback transfer from Fordham University.

Taaffe immediately went to work and the 2009 offense featured senior transfer quarterback Brett Hodges and a sophomore running-back Brynn Harvey. UCF posted an 8–5 record for the year, losing its bowl game, St. Petersburg Bowl, to Rutgers 24 to 45. Beginning the 2010 season, UCF's offense featured a two-quarterback system, which junior Rob Calabrese and freshman Jeffrey Godfrey. Taaffe also devised a committee of running-backs for the Knights run-game, including Ronnie Weaver, Latavius Murray, and Jonathan Davis. Jeff Godfrey would eventually take over as the starter after an injury to Rob Calabrese early in the season. Taaffe would also develop a new offensive package known as the "Wild Knight." The new offensive package developed by Taaffe and the Knights continued defensive dominance led the Knights to their most successful season in program history. The Conference USA Championship game featured a 17–7 win over the SMU Mustangs, earning UCF its second C-USA title, and earning the Knights an invite to the AutoZone Liberty Bowl. The Knights would defeat SEC foe Georgia 10–6 in the Liberty Bowl, for the program's first ever bowl win. With the successful season, UCF was ranked in the final polls for the first time, No. 20 in the coaches poll, No. 21 in the AP poll, and No. 25 in the BCS poll. In the 2013 season, the UCF Knights, with Taaffe as offensive coordinator, capped off a 12–1 record with a victory in the Fiesta Bowl, upsetting No. 5 Baylor 52–42. The combined 94 points were the most ever scored in a Fiesta Bowl. Adding another feather to Taaffe's offensive cap, UCF's quarterback for the 2013 season, Blake Bortles, would go on to be drafted third overall in the 2014 NFL Draft by the Jacksonville Jaguars.

Death
On October 30, 2019, Taaffe's sister posted on Facebook that he had died from cancer.

Head coaching record

College

CFL

References

1950 births
2019 deaths
Deaths from cancer in Florida
American football quarterbacks
Albany Great Danes football coaches
Army Black Knights football coaches
Clemson Tigers football players
Georgia Tech Yellow Jackets football coaches
Hamilton Tiger-Cats coaches
Maryland Terrapins football coaches
Montreal Alouettes coaches
NC State Wolfpack football coaches
Sportspeople from Albany, New York
Pittsburgh Panthers football coaches
Siena Saints football players
The Citadel Bulldogs football coaches
UCF Knights football coaches
Virginia Cavaliers football coaches